Joseph Crawford, OBE (April 1910 – August 1997) was a British trade unionist.

Crawford grew up in Annfield Plain in County Durham, where he attended the local school, then began working as a coal miner at the age of fourteen.

He married Hannah Jane Horswill on 3 June 1933. They had three children Trevor, Jean and Pauline.

At the age of 29, he was promoted to become a deputy, and joined the National Association of Colliery Overmen, Deputies and Shotfirers (NACODS). He became increasingly active in the union, as secretary of his local branch, then as general secretary of its Durham area and a member of the National Council. In 1953, he was elected as the union's vice president, then in 1956 he became its president, and finally in 1960 he was elected as general secretary of the national union.

As leader of the union, Crawford represented it at the Trades Union Congress (TUC), and he served on its General Council. Between 1972 and 1973, he was the President of the TUC. He retired from his trade union posts later that year.

Crawford spoke at many conferences around the globe including being presented a gold Hartford University graduation ring for attending and speaking at a seminar at the University whilst in America.

In his spare time, Crawford also served on the Mining Qualifications Board, as a governor of Ruskin College, the United World College of the Atlantic, and Welbeck College, and was a member of the council of St George's House (Windsor Castle). He was appointed an OBE and made an Officer of the Order of the British Empire in the 1971 Birthday Honours. for his services to the Mining Industry (particularly towards working conditions and Health and Safety). https://en.wikipedia.org/wiki/National_Association_of_Colliery_Overmen,_Deputies_and_Shotfirers

He also served for many years as a Methodist laypreacher and was wholly religious.

Personal life

The family moved from Durham to Finchley (North London), eventually buying a holiday home in Littlehampton (near Brighton) which they eventually moved down to live in permanently after retiring.

Joseph (Jo) regularly featured on the BBC's Question Time program where he was chauffeured to and from the BBC studios. He also enjoyed regular visits to No 10 Downing Street where, as a particularly outspoken unionist/labour supporter, he is reported to have given Margeret Thatcher a particular hard time on more than one occasion over afternoon tea.

He regularly enjoyed playing bowls during his retirement, and had a love for watching cricket and ate a bacon sandwich every day for breakfast.

Their children all married. Trevor Crawford married Dorothy and they had Adam, Helen and Ruth. Jean married and Phil Reed had Yvonne and Andrew Reed. Pauline married Harry Robinson had Timothy and Simon Robinson.

References

1910 births
Year of death missing
People from Annfield Plain
British trade union leaders
Members of the General Council of the Trades Union Congress
Presidents of the Trades Union Congress